Athetis lineosa is a moth of the  family Noctuidae. It is found in Asia, including Taiwan, Japan and India.

The wingspan is 31–37 mm.

References

Moths described in 1881
Acronictinae
Moths of Asia
Moths of Taiwan
Moths of Japan